Sharon Burey is a Canadian senator and pediatrician from Ontario. She was appointed to the Senate of Canada on November 21, 2022, on the advice of Prime Minister Justin Trudeau.

Burey was born in Jamaica and moved to Canada in 1976. In addition to her work as a pediatrician, Burey is a health policy advocate, having served on the executive council of the Pediatricians Alliance of Ontario and the health policy committee of the Ontario Medical Association. She was the first woman of colour to become president of the Pediatricians Alliance of Ontario.

References 

Living people
21st-century Canadian politicians
Canadian senators from Ontario
Independent Canadian senators
Women members of the Senate of Canada
21st-century Canadian women politicians
Black Canadian politicians
Black Canadian women
Jamaican emigrants to Canada
Year of birth missing (living people)